Bohumil Steigenhöfer  (1 March 1905 – 6 June 1989) was a Czechoslovak ice hockey player who competed in the 1928 Winter Olympics. In 1928 he participated with the Czechoslovak team in the Olympic tournament.

References

External links
 
 Olympic ice hockey tournaments 1928 

1905 births
1989 deaths
Olympic ice hockey players of Czechoslovakia
HC Slavia Praha players
Ice hockey players at the 1928 Winter Olympics
Ice hockey people from Prague
People from the Kingdom of Bohemia
Czech ice hockey forwards
Czechoslovak ice hockey forwards